Lounès Matoub (January 24, 1956 – June 25, 1998) was an Algerian Kabylian singer, poet, thinker who sparked an intellectual revolution, and mandole player who was an advocate of the Berber cause, human rights, and secularism in Algeria throughout his life.

Matoub was reviled by most of the Muslim population in Algeria for his secular and atheist politics along with his militant advocacy of Berber rights, so he was unpopular among both warring parties during the Algerian Civil War. His assassination, claimed by the Armed Islamic Group (GIA), in circumstances which remain unclear, provoked violent riots in Kabylia.

Early life
Lounes Matoub was born on 24 January 1956 in the village of Taourirt Moussa in Algerian Kabylia.  When he turned 9, he built his first guitar from an empty car oil can and composed his first songs as a teenager. His political and cultural identity was awakened by armed confrontations between Kabylians and government forces in 1963–1964. In 1968, the Algerian government introduced a policy of Arabization in the education system. Matoub reacted by skipping school; his memoirs recall: "We had to give up Berber and reject French. I said no! I played hooky in all my Arabic classes. Every class that I missed was an act of resistance, a slice of liberty conquered. My rejection was voluntary and purposeful." By 1975, he had abandoned formal education. He left for France in search of work.

Musical career

Matoub began his singing career under the patronage of the established singer Idir. He recorded his first album Ay Izem (The Lion) in 1978; it was a phenomenal success. He went on to record 36 albums, as well as writing songs for other artists. He gave his first major concert in April 1980, at the time of the "Berber Spring" protest movement in Kabylia.

His music mixes Algerian Andalucian Chaabi orchestration with politicized Kabyle (Berber) lyrics, and covers a broad variety of topics including the Berber cause, democracy, freedom, religion, Islamism, love, exile, memory, history, peace and human rights. Unlike the Berber poet/musicians who preceded him, Matoub's style was direct and confrontational. Fellow musician Mohamed Alileche recalls:

Despite being banned from Algerian radio and television during his life, Matoub became, and remains, an extremely popular Kabylian singer.

Political events
During the riots in October 1988, Matoub was shot five times by a policeman and left for dead. His 1989 album L'Ironie du sort describes his long convalescence.

During the civil war, which began in 1992, the Islamist Armed Islamic Group added his name to a hitlist of artists and intellectuals. Matoub remained in Algeria. On 25 September 1994, he was abducted. He was held for two weeks in a GIA mountain stronghold and condemned to death. He was released following a large public demonstration in which his supporters threatened "total war" on the Islamists.

In 1994, he published his autobiography entitled Rebelle (Paris: Stock, 1995).

Prizes

On December 6, 1994, Matoub received Le Prix de la Mémoire ("The Memorial Prize") from Mrs. Danielle Mitterrand, President of La Fondation France Libertés ("The French Liberties Foundation") in Paris; the prize recognises those who devote themselves to recording and preserving the impact of political events on ordinary lives.
On March 22, 1995, the Canadian journalists' organisation SCIJ awarded him Le Prix de la Liberté d'Expression ("The Prize for Freedom of Expression").
On December 19, 1995, he received Le Prix Tahar Djaout ("The Tahar Djaout Prize") from La Fondation Nourredine Abba ("The Nourredine Abba Foundation") at UNESCO headquarters in Paris; the prize is named for an Algerian writer who was assassinated by Islamists in 1993.

Assassination and aftermath

On 25 June 1998, at approximately 12:30 pm local time, Matoub's car was stopped at a roadblock while he was driving along a mountainous road in eastern Algeria (Kabylia). The car was fired upon by masked gunmen, killing Matoub and wounding his wife, Nadia Matoub,  and two sisters-in-law. Within hours, news of Matoub's murder had spread throughout Kabylia and thousands of angry mourners gathered around the hospital where his body was taken. The crowd shouted "Pouvoir, Assassin" ("Government, Assassins"). A week of violent riots followed his death. Young demonstrators clashed with riot police and attacked government property. On 28 June 1998 tens of thousands people attended his funeral in front of his house in his native village. He was buried between a fig tree and a cherry tree, opposite the house he was born in. Matoub's family played a scathing parody of the Algerian national anthem, which came from Matoub's final album Lettre ouverte aux...  ("Open letter to..."), released after his death (Gold-Disc). Matoub's assassination occurred a week before a law excluding languages other than Arabic from public life was due to come into effect. Matoub had been an outspoken critic of this law.

On 30 June 1998 the GIA claimed responsibility for the assassination of Matoub.

On the first anniversary of his death, a general strike was observed in the Kabylian city of Tizi-Ouzou and thousands protested on the streets. Protesters broke into the town's court room and tore down its scales of justice. The BBC reported that many Berber activists blamed the government for Matoub's death and rejected its claim that Islamists were responsible.

Around 20,000 people marched in Tizi-Ouzou to mark the third anniversary of Matoub's assassination.

His family have created a foundation in his name to promote his memory, cast light on the circumstances of his assassination and promote the values he defended. Two streets in France have been named after Matoub, one in Grenoble and one in Lyon.

On 18 July 2011, two men, Malik Madjnoun and Abdelhakim Chenoui, were convicted of killing Matoub, and sentenced to 12 years in jail. The one-day trial was suspended twice when Matoub's family interrupted to insist the suspects were innocent. As Madjnoun and Chenoui had been in prison awaiting trial since 1999, they were released in 2012, having served their time.

Political views of Matoub

Matoub spoke out in favour of federalism, secularism, democracy, freedom of speech, the recognition of Berber as a national and official language, and the decentralization of public schools in Algeria.

For a period of time, he was a member of the Rally for Culture and Democracy,  an opposition party in Algeria, although he had left the party by the time of his death.

References

"Matoub Lounès : Biographie" . Kabylie – A La Memoire De Lounes Matoub. Retrieved 22 May 2013.
Silverstein, Paul A. (Fall 1998). " Rebels and Martyrs: The Mobilization of Kabyle Society and the Assassination of Lounes Matoub". Middle East Report 28.
Snowdon, Peter; Lallami, Hamid (2–8 July 1998). "The birth of Matoub Lounes". Al-Ahram Weekly Online 384.
"Algerian police fire on Matoub protesters". BBC News. 24 June 1999.
"Berbers mark death of protest singer". BBC News. 25 June 2001.

External links

La Kabylie de Matoub Lounes, a Kabyle cultural website dedicated to Matoub's memory.
Matoub Lounes, a website dedicated to Matoub's memory; includes photos and songs. It is written in French and some Kabyle.
Page with a good paragraph talking about Matoub's use of music in politics.

1956 births
1998 deaths
20th-century Algerian poets
20th-century Algerian male actors
20th-century male writers
20th-century Algerian male singers
Algerian secularists
Algerian mondol players
Algerian atheists
Algerian male poets
Assassinated activists
Assassinated Algerian people
Berber activists
Berber poets
Berber musicians
People from Aït Mahmoud
Kabyle people
Kidnapped Algerian people
People murdered in Algeria
People killed by Islamic terrorism